Six years after the first one, and now as a married couple, Nell Hopman and Harry Hopman claimed their second domestic title by defeating May Blick and Abel Kay 6–2, 6–0, to win the mixed doubles tennis title at the 1936 Australian Championships.

Seeds

  Nell Hopman /  Harry Hopman (champions)
  Joan Hartigan /  Gar Moon (semifinals)
  Joan Walters /  Don Turnbull (first round)
  Gwen Griffiths /  Len Schwartz (semifinals)

Draw

Draw

Notes

References

External links
  Source for seedings and the draw

1936 in Australian tennis
Mixed Doubles